Greenville is an unincorporated community and census-designated place (CDP) in Love County, Oklahoma, United States. It was first listed as a CDP following the 2010 census.

Interstate 35 passes just west of Greenville, with access from Exit 21 (Oswalt Road)  to the north.

Demographics

References 

Census-designated places in Love County, Oklahoma
Census-designated places in Oklahoma